The following is a list of notable deaths in January 1997.

Entries for each day are listed alphabetically by surname. A typical entry lists information in the following sequence:
 Name, age, country of citizenship at birth, subsequent country of citizenship (if applicable), reason for notability, cause of death (if known), and reference.

January 1997

1
Prince Eugen of Bavaria, 71, German noble.
Aenne Brauksiepe, 84, German politician.
Asnoldo Devonish, 64, Venezuelan track and field athlete. 
Al Eugster, 87, American animator, writer, and film director.
Jean Feller, 77, Luxembourgian footballer.
Ivan Graziani, 51, Italian singer-songwriter and guitarist, colon cancer.
Hagood Hardy, 59, Canadian composer, pianist, and vibraphonist, lymphoma.
Mohammed Hafez Ismail, 77, Egyptian diplomat and ambassador.
Graham Kersey, 25, English cricketer, traffic accident.
Hans-Martin Majewski, 85, German composer of film scores.
James B. Pritchard, 87, American archeologist.
Joan Rice, 66, English film actress.
Franco Volpi, 75, Italian actor and voice actor, cancer.
Townes Van Zandt, 52, American singer-songwriter, cardiac arrythmia.
Ladislau Zilahi, 74, Romanian football player and manager.

2
Randy California, 45, American guitarist, singer and songwriter, drowned.
Samuel Carlisi, 82, American mobster, heart attack.
Joan Coromines, 91, Spanish linguist.
Antonio Giordani Soika, 83, Italian entomologist and ecologist.
Moshe Wilensky, 86, Polish-Israeli composer.

3
Werner Genuit, 59, German classical pianist and composer.
Roger Goeb, 82, American composer.
Michel Heller, 74, Russian historian, heart attack.
Pieter Keuneman, 79, Sri Lankan communist politician.
Jon Lennart Mjøen, 84, Norwegian actor, film director and screenwriter.
Gianfranco Pandolfini, 76, Italian water polo player.
Marie Torre, 72, American television journalist, lung cancer.
Odd Øyen, 82, Norwegian physician and resistance member during World War II.

4
Hédi Berkhissa, 24, Tunisian footballer, heart attack.
Akhteruzzaman Elias, 53, Bangladeshi novelist and short story writer.
Harry Helmsley, 87, American real estate mogul, pneumonia.
Harry P. Jeffrey, 95, American attorney and politician.
Bill Lancaster, 49, American screenwriter (The Thing, The Bad News Bears) and actor (Moses the Lawgiver).
Lucien Rebuffic, 75, French basketball player.
Tormod Skagestad, 76, Norwegian poet, novelist, playwright and actor.
Richard Taitano, 75, Guamanian politician.

5
André Franquin, 73, Belgian comics artist, (Spirou & Fantasio, Gaston, Marsupilami), heart attack.
Peter Zack Geer, 68, American politician, cancer.
Prince Bertil, Duke of Halland, 84, Swedish royal, third son of King Gustaf VI Adolf.
Homer Hobbs, 73, American football player and coach.
Burton Lane, 84, American composer and lyricist.
Frans Piët, 91, Dutch comics artist (Sjors en Sjimmie).
Emil Roy, 89, American baseball player.
V. C. Wynne-Edwards, 90, English zoologist.

6
Herbert Blitzstein, 62, American mobster, murdered.
Dick Donovan, 69, American MLB baseball player, cancer.
Kalevi Laitinen, 78, Finnish gymnast and Olympic champion.
Teiichi Matsumaru, 87, Japanese football player.
Charles Murphy, 88, Australian politician.
Catherine Scorsese, 84, Italian-American actress (Goodfellas), Alzheimer's disease.

7
Tod Goodwin, 85, American gridiron football player.
Paul-Werner Hozzel, 86, Nazi Germany Luftwaffe pilot during World War II.
Christopher Mayhew, 81, British politician.
Patricia McLaughlin, 80, Northern Irish politician.
Sándor Végh, 84, Hungarian-French, violinist and conductor.

8
Smiley Bates, 59, Canadian country singer, songwriter, and musician, cancer.
Melvin Calvin, 85, American biochemist, heart failure.
Paul Endacott, 94, American basketball player.
James Fraser, 72, Scottish surgeon.
Harold Foote Gosnell, 100, American political scientist and author.
George Handy, 76, American jazz arranger, composer and pianist.
Phyllis Hartnoll, 90, British poet, author and editor.
Alfred John Markiewicz, 68, American prelate of the Catholic Church.

9
Karol Borhy, 84, Czechoslovak football coach.
Ove Dahlberg, 65, Swedish ice hockey referee, heart attack.
Angelo Drossos, 68, American basketball executive, Parkinson's disease.
Ellen Griffin Dunne, 64, American actress and activist, multiple sclerosis.
Muhammadu Junaidu, 91, Nigerian historian and writer.
Shorty McWilliams, 70, American football player.
Edward Osóbka-Morawski, 87, Polish activist and politician.
Jesse White, 80, American actor and comedian, heart attack.

10
Mary Bancroft, 93, American novelist and spy.
Samuel Preston Bayard, 88, American folklorist and musicologist.
Emmet Reid Blake, 88, American ornithologist and museum curator.
Gordon W. Burrows, 70, American politician, cardiac arrest.
André Caron, 52, member of the House of Commons of Canada from 1993 to 1997, cancer.
Seymour Halpern, 83, American politician.
Elspeth Huxley, 89, English author, journalist, broadcaster, and government adviser.
Valentin Koptyug, 65, Soviet/Russian chemist.
Phil Marchildon, 83, Canadian Major League Baseball player.
Tordis Maurstad, 95, Norwegian stage actress.
Martin Pike, 76, British athlete.
Alexander R. Todd, Baron Todd, 89, Scottish biochemist and Nobel Prize laureate, heart attack.
Shiv Verma, 92, Indian revolutionary.
Lee Willerman, 57, American psychologist.
Albert Wohlstetter, 83, American nuclear strategist.
George Young, 74, Scottish footballer.

11
Arild Andersen, 68, Norwegian racing cyclist.
Bhabatosh Datta, 85, Indian economist, academic and writer.
Rosalind Hill, 88, English historian, heart failure.
Pancheti Koteswaram, 81, Indian meteorologist, hydrologist, and atmospheric physicist.
Sheldon Leonard, 89, American actor, producer, director, and writer.
Stu Martin, 84, American Major League Baseball player.
Jerry Neudecker, 66, American MLB umpire, cancer.
Helen Foster Snow, 89, American journalist.
Jill Summers, 86, English music hall performer and comedian, kidney failure.
Ian White-Thomson, 92, British Anglican priest.

12
Jean-Edern Hallier, 60, French writer, critic and editor, cerebral haemorrhage after fall, heart attack, traffic collision.
Jean Hoerni, 72, Swiss-American engineer.
Charles Brenton Huggins, 95, Canadian-American cancer researcher and Nobel Prize in Physiology or Medicine laureate.
Ewa Larysa Krause, 22, Polish judoka, traffic collision.
Wally Rose, 83, American jazz and ragtime pianist.
Jorge Suárez, 51, Salvadoran football player, cancer.

13
Sivar Arnér, 87, Swedish novelist and playwright.
Burton Barr, 79, American businessman and politician, kidney failure.
Johannes Coleman, 86, South African marathon runner and Olympian.
Max Kaser, 90, German academic and professor of jurisprudence.
Leo Margolis, 69, Canadian parasitologist, heart attack.
Baburaoji Parkhe, 84, Indian industrialist.
Ruslan Stratonovich, 66, Russian physicist and engineer.
Herman V. Wall, 91, American combat photographer during World War II.

14
John Amdisen, 62, Danish football player.
Shalva Chikhladze, 84, Soviet light-heavyweight wrestler and Olympian.
Leonard Dodson, 84, American golfer.
Celso Ferreira, 46, Brazilian football player.
King Hu, 64, Chinese film director and actor, complications from angioplasty.
Robert Irsay, 73, American football team owner.
Ebba Lodden, 83, Norwegian civil servant and politician.
Roland Martin, 84, French archaeologist.
Dollard Ménard, 83, Canadian general.
Knud Nellemose, 88, Danish sculptor.

15
Oscar Auerbach, 92, American physician and pathologist.
Edwin Smith, 74, New Zealand rower.
Ahmad Tafazzoli, 59, Iranian Iranist and professor of ancient Iranian languages, homicide.
Kenneth V. Thimann, 92, English-American plant physiologist and microbiologist.

16
Romano Amerio, 91, Swiss Italian theologian.
Ödön Gróf, 81, Hungarian swimmer and Olympian.
Roy Henderson, 73, Scottish football player.
Markus Hoffmann, 26, German actor, suicide.
Nils Katajainen, 77, Finnish flying ace during World War II.
Erik Källström, 88, Swedish football player.
Iain Mills, 56, English politician.
Shinobu Muraki, 73, Japanese production designer and art director (Ran).
Beverly Peer, 84, American jazz double-bassist, cancer.
Martin Redmond, 59, British politician.
Juan Landázuri Ricketts, 83, Peruvian catholic cardinal.
Jeff Teale, 57, British international athlete and Olympian.
Rajagopala Tondaiman, 74, Indian monarch and the last Raja of Pudukkottai.
Barbara Woodell, 86, American actress.
Willie Yeadon, 89, British railway historian.

17
Susanna Al-Hassan, 69, Ghanaian author and politician.
Earl Girard, 69, American football player.
Robert Giraud, 75, French journalist, poet and lexicographer.
Björn Isfält, 54, Swedish composer, cancer.
Bill Kardash, 84, Canadian politician.
Bert Kelly, 84, Australian politician and government minister.
Amha Selassie, 80, Ethiopian Emperor-in-exile and son of Haile Selassie I.
Clyde Tombaugh, 90, American astronomer.
Theo Wilson, 79, American reporter, cerebral hemorrhage.

18
Herbert A. Allen, Sr., 88, American stockbroker.
Ruth Brinkmann, 62, American actress and founder of Vienna's English Theatre, ovarian cancer.
Adriana Caselotti, 80, American actress and singer (Snow White and the Seven Dwarfs), lung cancer.
Keith Diamond, 46, American songwriter and producer, heart attack.
Jean Gravelle, 69, Canadian ice hockey player.
Henry Hermansen, 75, Norwegian cross-country skier and Olympian.
Ardis Krainik, 67, American mezzo-soprano opera singer.
Diana Lewis, 77, American film actress, pancreatic cancer.
Myfanwy Piper, 85, British art critic and opera librettist.
Gilberto Martínez Solares, 90, Mexican actor, cinematographer, screenwriter, and director.
Darío Suro, 79, Dominican Republic art critic, diplomat and painter.
Paul Tsongas, 55, American politician, non-Hodgkin lymphoma.

19
Robert Chapatte, 75, French cyclist and sports journalist.
James Dickey, 73, American poet and novelist.
Richard E. Jennings, 75, English comics artist, pneumonia.
Vasily Nalimov, 86, Russian philosopher and humanist.
Charles Nelson, 95, American film editor (Picnic, Cat Ballou, A Song to Remember), Oscar winner (1956).
Sudhir, 75, Pakistani film actor, director and producer.

20
Albín Brunovský, 61, Slovak painter and graphic artist.
Curt Flood, 59, American baseball player, pneumonia.
Hiram Keller, 52, American actor, liver cancer.
Joseph J. Loferski, 71, American physicist.
Tamara Makarova, 89, Soviet actress.
Ashious Melu, 39, Zambian footballer and coach.
Konrad Püschel, 89, German architect, town planner, and university professor.
Dennis Main Wilson, 72, British radio and television producer, lung cancer.

21
John Glyn-Jones, 87, British actor.
Hans Egon Holthusen, 83, German nazi, writer and academic.
Sourendra Nath Kohli, 80, Indian Navy admiral.
Irwin Levine, 58, American songwriter.
Louis Miehe-Renard, 77, Danish film actor.
Shinroku Momose, 77, Japanese aircraft/automotive engineer.
Eduardo Morera, 91, Argentine film director.
Colonel Tom Parker, 87, Dutch-American manager of Elvis Presley, stroke.
Giorgio Prosperi, 85, Italian screenwriter.
Polly Ann Young, 88, American actress, cancer.

22
Ênio Andrade, 68, Brazilian football player and manager.
L. Kijungluba AO, 90, Indian baptist missionary.
Pilar Barbosa, 98, Puerto Rican educator, historian and political activist.
George Dockins, 79, American baseball player.
Ron Holden, 57, American pop and R&B singer, heart attack.
Elwyn Lynn, 79, Australian artist, author and art critic.
Billy Mackenzie, 39, Scottish singer and songwriter, suicide.
Cornelio Reyna, 56, Mexican singer, composer and actor.
Willard Wheatley, 81, British Virgin Islands politician and Chief Minister.
Wally Whyton, 67, British musician, songwriter and radio and TV personality.

23
Richard Berry, 61, American singer, songwriter and musician, aneurysm.
Paul Egli, 85, Swiss road bicycle racer.
Randy Greenawalt, 47, American serial killer, execution by lethal injection.
Alois Hudec, 88, Czechoslovak gymnast and World and Olympic Champion.
Lyudmila Marchenko, 56, Soviet film actress.
Hardy Rafn, 66, Danish film actor.
Roger Tayler, 67, British astronomer, cancer.
Rolling Thunder, 80, American hippy spiritual leader, complications of diabetes.
David Waller, 76, English actor.
Bill Zuckert, 81, American actor, pneumonia.

24
William Alexander, 81, German painter and television host.
Lourdino Barreto, 58, Indian musicologist and composer.
Dr. Jerry Graham, 75, American professional wrestler, cerebrovascular disease.
Jack Halloran, 81, American composer and choral director.
Ida Kohlmeyer, 84, American painter.
Roy Sproson, 66, English footballer and manager.
Suzy Vernon, 95, French film actress.

25
Werner Aspenström, 78, Swedish poet.
Dan Barry, 73, American cartoonist.
Donald Beer, 61, American rower and Olympic champion, brain cancer.
James Boyd, 66, American boxer, cancer.
Manuel Tuñón de Lara, 81, Spanish historian.
Jeane Dixon, 93, American astrologer, heart failure.
Exuma, 54, Bahamian musician, artist, playwright and author, heart attack.
Carlton Benjamin Goodlett, 82, American physician and newspaper publisher.
Edith Thacher Hurd, 86, American children's author.
Nikola Koljević, 60, Bosnian Serb politician, essayist, and scholar, suicide.
George W. Mitchell, 92, American economist.
Seldon Powell, 68, American jazz, music, and R&B tenor saxophonist and flautist.
Elizabeth Rudel Smith, 85, American politician.
Bill Wightkin, 69, American gridiron football player.

26
Sufi Barkat Ali, 85, Indian muslim sufi.
Jack Clayton, 82, American football, basketball, and baseball coach, congestive heart failure.
Shūhei Fujisawa, 69, Japanese author.
Cornelius Herman Muller, 87, American botanist and ecologist.
Guy Raymond, 85, American actor.
Margaret Hessen und bei Rhein, 83, German princess.
Laurence Stoddard, 93, American rowing coxswain.
Donald E. Stokes, 69, American political scientist, acute leukemia.
Mira Zimińska, 95, Polish actress.

27
Bill Kennedy, 88, American actor and television show host.
Cecil Arthur Lewis, 98, British last surviving World War I fighter ace.
Gerald Marks, 96, American composer.
Louis E. Martin, 84, American journalist, newspaper publisher and civil rights activist.
Zia Sarhadi, 83, Pakistani screenwriter and film director.
Harish Chandra Sarin, 82, Indian civil servant, writer and defence secretary of India.
Richard X. Slattery, 71, American actor.
David Townsend, 84, English cricket player.
Aleksandr Zarkhi, 88, Soviet film director, screenwriter, and playwright.

28
Antônio Callado, 80, Brazilian journalist, playwright, and novelist.
Edmond de Stoutz, 76, Swiss conductor.
Anna Galmarini, 54, Italian figure skater.
Raya Garbousova, 87, Russian-American cellist.
Alfred Gell, 51, British social anthropologist.
Mikel Koliqi, 96, Albanian cardinal of the Roman Catholic Church.
Wong Shun Leung, 61, Hong Kong martial artist, stroke.
Louis Pauwels, 76, French journalist and writer, heart attack.
Geoffrey Rippon, 72, British politician.
Pandurang Vasudeo Sukhatme, 85, Indian statistician.

29
Antal Benda, 86, Hungarian field handball player.
Irma Greta Blohm, 85, German politician.
Ken Harada, 77, Japanese politician.
Daniel P. Mannix, 85, American writer, journalist, animal trainer, and performer.
Mumtaz Mirza, 57, Indian Urdu poet.
Clifford Richmond, 82, New Zealand lawyer and judge.
Osvaldo Soriano, 54, Argentine journalist and writer, lung cancer.
Thomas Daniel Young, 77, American academic.

30
Charles Hargens, 103, American painter.
Willis Harman, 78, American engineer, futurist, and autho, brain cancer.
Duane Josephson, 54, American baseball player.
Nicholas Mallett, 51, British television director.
Henry Bentinck, 11th Earl of Portland, 77, British noble and activist.
Frank Tejeda, 51, United States Marine and politician, brain cancer.

31
Raymond Coxon, 100, British artist.
Hedy Graf, 70, Spanish-Swiss soprano.
Eve Lister, 83, British actress.
Seth Lover, 87, American inventor.
Zahir Pajaziti, 34, Kosovo Albanian guerilla commander, killed in action.
John Joseph Scanlan, 90, American catholic bishop.
Eugenia Smith, 98, American Romanov impostor.
Alexander Solonik, 36, Russian gangster, strangled.
Andrzej Szczepkowski, 73, Polish actor.
Hans Tisdall, 86, German-British artist.

References 

1997-01
 01